Michael Caicedo Sánchez (born June 21, 2003) is a Spanish professional basketball player for Covirán Granada of the Liga ACB on loan from FC Barcelona.

Early life and youth career
Michael was born in Inca, Mallorca  and he is the son of a Colombian father and a Spanish mother. In December 2020, he was named MVP of the Euroleague Basketball Next Generation Tournament in Valencia.

Professional career 
Caicedo made his senior debut for Barcelona in the Liga ACB on January 9, 2021, against Manresa. On October 28, 2021, he made his EuroLeague debut playing 21 seconds against Maccabi Tel Aviv.

References

External links
Michael Caicedo at acb.com
Michael Caicedo at euroleaguebasketball.net
Michael Caicedo at basketball-reference.com

2003 births
Living people
Spanish people of Colombian descent
Spanish men's basketball players
FC Barcelona Bàsquet players
Liga ACB players
Shooting guards
Small forwards
People from Inca, Mallorca
Sportspeople from Mallorca